Burgsvik  is a locality situated in Öja in the Swedish island of Gotland with 350 inhabitants in 2014. Burgsvik lies in the southern part of the island of Gotland. The Burgsvik beds are a geological sequence found there.

References

External links 
Objects from Burgsvik at the Digital Museum by Nordic Museum

Populated places in Gotland County